"Perfect Life" is a song performed by German singer Levina. The song was released as a digital download on 9 February 2017 through Sony Music Entertainment Germany as the lead single from her debut studio album Unexpected (2017). The song was written by Lindsey Ray, Lindy Robbins, and Dave Bassett. It represented Germany in the Eurovision Song Contest 2017.

The song is also a subject of controversy due to its alleged similarities with other well-known songs such as "Titanium" by David Guetta, to which a possible plagiarism is discussed.

Eurovision Song Contest

On 6 January 2017, Levina was confirmed to be one of the five finalists competing in Unser Song 2017, Germany's national final for the Eurovision Song Contest 2017. On 9 February 2017, the night of the final, Levina advanced to the final round with both the songs "Wildfire" and "Perfect Life". The German public then chose "Perfect Life" as the winner. As Germany is a member of the "Big Five", she automatically advanced to the final, held on 13 May 2017 in Kyiv, Ukraine.

Criticism 
Several news sites and blogs had discussed a possible plagiarism of "Perfect Life" from the songs "Titanium" by David Guetta and "Young and Wild", a song composed by Aleksandra Kovač for the 2014 German film of the same name.

Track listing

Charts

Weekly charts

Release history

References

Eurovision songs of Germany
Eurovision songs of 2017
2017 songs
Sony Music singles
Songs written by Lindy Robbins
Songs written by Dave Bassett (songwriter)
2017 debut singles
Songs involved in plagiarism controversies